Rhopalonematidae is a family of hydrozoans. The family comprises 15 genera and 36 species.

Genera

Aglantha (4 species)
Aglaura (monotypic – Aglaura hemistoma)
Amphogona (3 species)
Arctapodema (4 species)
Benthocodon (2 species)
Colobonema (3 species)
Crossota (5 species)
Pantachogon (3 species)
Persa (monotypic – Persa incolorata)
Ransonia (monotypic – Ransonia krampi)
Rhopalonema (2 species)
Sminthea (2 species)
Tetrorchis (monotypic – Tetrorchis erythrogaster)
Vampyrocrossota (monotypic – Vampyrocrossota childressi)
Voragonema (4 species)

References

 Schuchert, Peter (2005): The Hydrozoa Directory – Order Trachymedusae Haeckel, 1879. Retrieved 4 November 2008.
Schuchert, P. (2011). Rhopalonematidae. In: Schuchert, P. World Hydrozoa database. Accessed through: World Register of Marine Species on 2011-07-05

 
Trachymedusae
Cnidarian families